All Time Hits is an album by American country singer Ernest Tubb, released in 1960 (see 1960 in music). It is not a compilation of Tubb's hits. Instead he covers older songs that had been hits for other country and honky-tonk singers.

Reception

In his Allmusic review, Bruce Eder wrote of the album "The mere existence of these songs makes them priceless, as documents of Tubb's style, even if they lack the urgency of his "own" songs."

Track listing
"Crazy Arms" (Ralph Mooney, Chuck Seals)
"Wondering" (Joe Werner)
"Tennessee Saturday Night" (Billy Hughes)
"Signed, Sealed and Delivered" (Lloyd Copas, Lois Mann)
"Cold, Cold Heart" (Hank Williams)
"I'm Movin' On" (Hank Snow)
"Wabash Cannonball" (A. P. Carter, William Kindt)	
"I Love You So Much (It Hurts)" (Floyd Tillman)
"Bouquet of Roses" (Steve Nelson, Bob Hilliard)
"I Walk the Line" (Johnny Cash)
"Four Walls" (George Campbell, Marvin Moore)
"Candy Kisses" (George Morgan)

Personnel
Ernest Tubb – vocals, guitar
Leon Rhodes – guitar
Howard Johnson – guitar
Grady Martin – guitar
Buddy Emmons – pedal steel guitar
Bobby Garrett – pedal steel guitar
Ben Shaenfele – pedal steel guitar
Jack Drake – bass
Farris Coursey – drums
Bun Wilson – drums
Floyd Cramer – piano

References

Ernest Tubb albums
1960 albums
Albums produced by Owen Bradley
Covers albums
Decca Records albums